Outen is a surname. Notable people include:

 Alby Outen (1902–1972), Australian rules footballer
 Chink Outen (1905–1961), American baseball player
 Denise van Outen (born 1974), British actress, TV presenter, and singer
 Sarah Outen (born 1985), British athlete and adventurer
 Savannah Outen